Ida Ferenczy was a female international table tennis player from Hungary.

She won a silver medal at the 1938 World Table Tennis Championships in the women's doubles with Dora Beregi.

See also
 List of table tennis players
 List of World Table Tennis Championships medalists

References

Hungarian female table tennis players
World Table Tennis Championships medalists